WY-46824 is a norepinephrine-dopamine reuptake inhibitor related to venlafaxine that was disclosed by Paige Mahaney, et al. of Wyeth in 2008. The compound actually appears in an article a year earlier in 2007 but is not the main focus of the work. 
It has NET binding of 46 nM, DAT = 58 nM and SERT = 18795 nM. The racemic compound was resolved into its constituent enantiomers, and the (S) enantiomer is the more active one. The N-desmethyl derivative shows similar activity.

References 

Cyclohexanols
Norepinephrine–dopamine reuptake inhibitors
Chloroarenes
Phenethylamines
Piperazines
Tertiary alcohols